Levie is a commune in the French department of Corse-du-Sud, collectivity of Corsica, France.

Population

See also
Communes of the Corse-du-Sud department

References

Communes of Corse-du-Sud
Corse-du-Sud communes articles needing translation from French Wikipedia